The Eclipse is a 2009 Irish supernatural drama film written and directed by Conor McPherson and starring  Ciarán Hinds, Iben Hjejle and Aidan Quinn.

Premise
Michael Farr (Ciarán Hinds) is a depressed widower who works as a teacher in the small seaside town of Cobh, in County Cork, Ireland, where he lives with his two children. While he continues to adjust to life without his beloved wife, who died two years earlier, he begins to experience strange, possibly supernatural occurrences connected to his elderly father-in-law, who is close to death in a local nursing home.

When Michael volunteers at the town's annual literary festival, he is assigned to look after Lena Morelle (Iben Hjejle). Lena is known for her ghost stories, and Michael, impressed with the realistic nature of her writing, shares his recent experiences with her. While Michael and Lena grow closer, another famous author, Nicholas Holden (Aidan Quinn), a married man with a scandalous reputation, arrives in town for the festival, hoping to rekindle a brief affair he had with Lena a year before. As Michael and Nicholas clash over Lena's affections, Michael's supernatural visions grow more vivid and disturbing.

Cast
 Ciarán Hinds as Michael Farr
 Iben Hjejle as Lena Morelle
 Aidan Quinn as Nicholas Holden
 Eanna Hardwicke as Thomas Farr
 Hannah Lynch as Sarah Farr
 Jim Norton as Malachy
 Billy Roche as Jim Belton
 Hilary O'Shaughnessy as TV Interviewer

Production
It was filmed in Cobh, Co. Cork.

Release
It premiered at the Tribeca Film Festival on 24 April 2009 where, after reports of interest from several studios, Magnolia Pictures secured worldwide distribution rights for the film. The film aired on Irish public-service broadcaster RTÉ One on 17 March 2010.

It was released in Australian cinemas in April 2010.

Awards
 Méliès D'Argent Award for Best European Film
 Best Film & Best Screenplay Awards 2010 Irish Film & Television Academy Awards
 Best Actor Award for Ciarán Hinds 2009 Tribeca Film Festival
 Best Supporting Actor Award for Aidan Quinn 2010 Irish Film & Television Academy Awards

References

External links
 
 
 
 
 
 
 The Eclipse at Scope: http://www.scope.nottingham.ac.uk/filmreview.php?issue=19&id=1257

2009 films
Irish drama films
English-language Irish films
2009 drama films
Films shot in Ireland
Films set in Ireland
2000s English-language films
Films directed by Conor McPherson